Timay al-Imdid (pčhimentēti), the ancient Thmuis and Mendes, is a city and markaz in Dakahlia Governorate of Egypt. The estimated population of the markaz in 2019 was 201,956, with 19,366 living in urban areas and 182,590 in rural areas.

Name 
The name Timayy is derived from the Coptic word ⲑⲙⲟⲩ tmoui, meaning "island", a fairly common Coptic place name element. In this case it is an abbreviation of Demotic tꜣ-mꜣw.t-n-pr-bꜣ-nb-ḏd.t "the island of Mendes".

History 
There were Coptic revolts in Timayy in 725-726 and 831-832. It had a Christian bishopric.

The 1885 Census of Egypt recorded Timay al-Imdid (as "Tami-el-Amdid") as a nahiyah under the district of El Senbellawein in Dakahlia Governorate; at that time, the population of the town was 1,338 (694 men and 644 women).

Notable people
El Deif Ahmed

References

Populated places in Dakahlia Governorate